Alba Roversi (born August 14, 1961) is a Venezuelan telenovela and theater actress who rose to fame in the 1980s and 1990s for her role in telenovelas.

Filmography

References

External links
 
 Alba Roversi: impulsiva, justa, romántica y llorona from 

1961 births
Living people
People from Valencia, Venezuela
Venezuelan stage actresses
Venezuelan telenovela actresses
20th-century Venezuelan actresses
21st-century Venezuelan actresses